Kouto is a town in northern Ivory Coast. It is a sub-prefecture of and the seat of Kouto Department in Bagoué Region, Savanes District. Kouto is also a commune. The town is known for its seventeenth century Sahelian mosque, which was inscribed on the UNESCO World Heritage List (along with other nearby mosques) in 2021. 

In 2021, the population of the sub-prefecture of Kouto was 55,893.

Villages
The 11 villages of the sub-prefecture of Kouto and their population in 2014 are:

Notes

Sub-prefectures of Bagoué
Communes of Bagoué